Shanti G. Patel (1922 – 2014) was an Indian politician and freedom fighter from Bombay, India, who served as Mayor of Mumbai and Member of Rajya Sabha (upper house of Indian parliament).

At the age of 93, he died on  June 13, 2014  at his home in Mahim.

See also 
 Mayor of Mumbai
 List of Rajya Sabha members from Maharashtra

References 

1921 births
2014 deaths
People from Mumbai
Politicians from Mumbai
Rajya Sabha members from Maharashtra
Indian independence activists from Maharashtra
Mayors of Mumbai
Indian National Congress politicians from Maharashtra
Maharashtra politicians